"Everything's on Fire" was the third single from Australian pub rockers, Hunters & Collectors' fourth studio album, Human Frailty. It was released after the album on 18 August 1986 in both 7" and 12" formats. It peaked in the top 100 on the Australian Kent Music Report Singles Chart and No. 44 on the New Zealand Singles Chart. "Everything's on Fire" was co-written by band members John Archer, Doug Falconer, Jack Howard, Robert Miles, Mark Seymour, Jeremy Smith, and Michael Waters.

Background 
Australian pub rockers Hunters & Collectors released "Everything's on Fire" on 18 August 1986 after their fourth studio album, Human Frailty which had appeared in April. The track was co-written by band members John Archer on bass guitar, Doug Falconer on drums, Jack Howard on trumpet, Robert Miles on live sound, Mark Seymour on lead vocals and guitar, Jeremy Smith on French horn, and Michael Waters on keyboards and trombone.

"Everything's on Fire" was released in both 7" and 12" formats on White Label/Mushroom Records and, as with the album, was co-produced by Gavin MacKillop with the band. The single reached the top 100 on the Australian Kent Music Report Singles Chart and No. 44 on the New Zealand Singles Chart.

It appeared on the group's first compilation album, Collected Works (November 1990). Andrew de Groot directed the music video for "Everything's on Fire" and its following single, "Is There Anybody in There?". Both appeared on the VHS compilation also titled, Collected Works. A live version of "Everything's on Fire" appeared on Living ... In Large Rooms and Lounges (November 1995) from a pub gig.

Reception 
In October 2010, "Everything's on Fire" was described in the book, 100 Best Australian Albums, by the three authors, John O'Donnell, Toby Creswell, and Craig Mathieson: "Seymour's lyrics all relate back to the folie à deux in the blue bed-sit. 'Dog', 'The Finger' and 'Everything's on Fire' are all songs of lust and obsessions".

Track listing

Personnel 
Credited to:
Hunters & Collectors members
 John Archer – bass guitar
 Doug Falconer – drums
 John 'Jack' Howard – trumpet
 Robert Miles – live sound, art director
 Mark Seymour – vocals, lead guitar
 Jeremy Smith – French horn
 Michael Waters – trombone, keyboards

Recording details
 Producer – Hunters & Collectors, Gavin MacKillop
 Engineer – Gavin MacKillop
Assistant engineer – Doug Brady, Michael Streefkerk
 Recording/mixing engineer – Robert Miles
 Studio – Allan Eaton Sound, St Kilda (recording); AAV Studio One, Melbourne (mixing)

Art works
Art director – Robert Miles

Charts

References

External links 

 Video of "Everything's on Fire"

1986 singles
1986 songs
Hunters & Collectors songs
Mushroom Records singles
Songs written by Mark Seymour